Kalyanam is a 2016 Singaporean soap opera starring Karthikeyan Somasundram, Nithya Shree, Jaynesh and Eswari Gunasagar. It was created by I.Sundar and is executively produced by Megastar Production's 'V.Kalaiselvan and Susiilaa Shanmugam. With Production Managed by Shasirekka Rountan and Lavin Selvan. It aired on Mediacorp Vasantham from 4 April 2016 to 23 June 2016, on Monday through Thursday at 10:00 pm SST for 45 episodes.

The drama follows the story of a bold girl, Anjali and her love-hate relationship with a wildlife photographer, Arjun. The theme of this soap opera centered on love and Singapore Indian marriage tradition.

Plot
The story revolves around a crazy, outgoing and bold girl, Anjali and her unusual love-hate relationship with her boyfriend Arjun, a wildlife photographer. Their almost heavenly, sweet courtship days and their close-to-hell married chaos makes up the crux of the story.

Cast

Main cast

 Karthikeyan Samasundram
 Nithya Shree as Anjali
 Jaynesh as Paarthi
 Eswari Gunasagar as Aarthi

Additional cast

 Devarajan 
 Varadarajan as Vishwa
 Varman Chandramohan as Sathya
 Dhivyah Raveen as Nisha
 Jayaraman as Anjali's father 
 Kokila as Anjali's mother
 Yuvina Malathi Ram as Vishwa's mother
 Lingam as Vishwa's father
 Jamesh Kumar as Anjali's boss
 Shamini Gunasager as Anjali's colleague
 Gowri Subramaniam
 Reuben
 Kathiraven
 Jenani
 Nagaraj 
 Vimala
 T. Malee
 Sashirekka
 Preethivi Raj

Episodes

Episode 01
Favourite star couple Anjali and Vishwa's wedding was abruptly called off inches before they were pronounced man and wife. Anjali walked out of her own wedding rejecting the love of her life. Why? What did Vishwa do? What exactly happened?

Episode 02
Anjali is pouring out her grievances about her wedding to her best friend, Paarthi. Anjali's boss is asking her to go on a short break. On the other hand, someone is secretly following Anjali. Who could it be?

Episode 03
Anjali's reputation and career is at stake. The public, family and friends are all talking about her wedding incident. How will Anjali react to this?

Episode 04
Anjali decides to go on a short getaway. Where is she off to?

Episode 05
Anjali goes to Kota Kinabalu and meets Arjun and befriends him. Where will their friendship take them?

Episode 06

Original soundtrack

Soundtrack

Broadcast
Series was released on 4 April 2016 on Mediacorp Vasantham. It aired in Malaysia on Mediacorp Vasantham, Its full length episodes and released its episodes on their app Toggle, a live TV feature was introduced on Toggle with English Subtitle.

Sequel
The season 2 of this drama started on 3 July 2017
 Kalyanam (season 2)

References

External links 
 Vasantham Official Website
 Vasantham Facebook
 Kalayanam Serial Episode

Vasantham TV original programming
Tamil-language television shows in Singapore
Tamil-language romance television series
Singapore Tamil dramas
2016 Tamil-language television series debuts
2016 Tamil-language television series endings